39th London Film Critics' Circle Awards
20 January 2019

Film of the Year:
Roma

British/Irish Film of the Year:
The Favourite

The 39th London Film Critics' Circle Awards, honouring the best in film for 2018, were announced by the London Film Critics' Circle on 20 January 2019 at The May Fair Hotel, in Mayfair, London. The nominations were announced on 18 December 2018. The event was hosted by British comedian Judi Love.

Winners and nominees
Winners are listed first and highlighted with boldface.

Special awards

The Dilys Powell Award for Excellence in Film
 Pedro Almodóvar

References

2
2018 film awards
2018 in British cinema
2018 in London
January 2019 events in the United Kingdom
2018 awards in the United Kingdom